Panagia tou Sinti Monastery (Greek: Παναγία του Σίντη) is an orthodox monastery near the village of Pentalia in the Paphos district of Cyprus. It is dedicated to the Virgin Mary.

It was founded in the 16th century. In 1997 it received a Europa Nostra award for its restoration and conservation.

Cypriot Orthodox monasteries
Greek Orthodox monasteries